Zajkowski is a surname. Notable people with the surname include:

 Antoni Zajkowski (born 1948), Polish judoka
 Michal Zajkowski (born 1983), Polish-Swedish ice hockey player

See also
Zajączkowski
Żakowski

Polish-language surnames